This is a list of broadcast television stations that are licensed in the U.S. state of Pennsylvania.

Full-power stations
VC refers to the station's PSIP virtual channel. RF refers to the station's physical RF channel.

Defunct full-power stations
Channel 16: WENS - Ind. - Pittsburgh - (8/25/1953-8/31/1957) 
Channel 17: WPCA-TV - Ind. - Philadelphia - (7/10/1960-8/1/1962 and 1/31/1963-6/?/1963) 
Channel 27: WCMB-TV - DuMont - Harrisburg (9/8/1954-4/9/1957) 
Channel 32: WBPZ-TV - Lock Haven (3/2/1958-9/4/1959)
Channel 33: WEEU-TV - NBC - Reading (4/9/1953-6/30/1955) 
Channel 34: WILK-TV - ABC/DuMont  - Wilkes-Barre/Scranton (9/7/1953-9/10/1958, merged with WNEP-TV)
Channel 35: WUHY-TV - NET/PBS - Philadelphia (1963-1972) 
Channel 46: WCHA-TV - Chambersburg (9/3/1953-7/18/1954)
Channel 49: WNOW-TV - DuMont - York (11/9/1953-5/31/1958)
Channel 51: WLEV-TV - NBC - Bethlehem (4/21/1953-10/31/1957)
Channel 53: WKJF-TV - NBC - Pittsburgh (7/14/1953-7/2/1954)
Channel 57: WGLV - ABC/DuMont - Easton (6/26/1953-11/1/1957) 
Channel 61: WHUM-TV - CBS - Reading (2/22/1953-9/4/1956)
Channel 67: WFMZ-TV (original) - Allentown (12/4/1954-4/15/1955)
Channel 73: WTVU - Scranton (8/17/1953-7/1/1955)

LPTV stations

Translator and Satellite stations

Pennsylvania

Television stations